Creole was launched in 1812 at Calcutta. She sailed between India and Mauritius and India and South East Asia. She was wrecked at Java in 1816.

Fate: Lloyd's List reported on 11 March 1817 that Creole, of Calcutta, was wrecked on the island of Gilion (or Galion; now Pulau Giliyang, Java), but that her was crew saved. The loss may have occurred in February 1816.

Citations and references
Citations

References
 
 

1812 ships
British ships built in India
Age of Sail merchant ships of England
Maritime incidents in 1816